The Ministry of Territorial Administration is one of the 35 Ministries existing in Cameroon. Preparation, implementation and assessment of Government policy on territorial administration, decentralization and civil protection is within the framework of the duties assigned to the MINATD.

It is the duty of the MINATD to organize the territorial administrative units, chiefdoms and external services, to organize national and local elections and referendums in accordance with the constitutional laws. By assuring the preparation and implementation of the laws and regulations and the maintenance of public order, the MINATD acts as a guarantor public liberties- associations and political organizations; religious organizations; non-profit movements, organizations and associations. Performing as a guarantor of the state powers, the MINATD oversees the activities of regional and local authorities. The MINATD is also in charge of preventing and managing the risks related to natural disasters.

See also
Njomgang Isaac, former Director-General of the Mimistry

References

Government of Cameroon